Gerald P. Carmen (born July 8, 1930) is an American businessman, former Administrator of General Services Administration, and former U.S. representative to the United Nations.

Early life 
On July 8, 1930, Carmen was born in Quincy, Massachusetts.

Career 
Carmen served as Administrator of the General Services Administration from 1981 to 1984, the United States Ambassador to the United Nations International Organizations in Geneva from 1984 to 1986 and as the President and Chief Executive Officer of the Federal Asset Disposition Association from 1988 to 1989.

Personal life 
Carmen's wife is Anita J. Saidel. They have 2 children.

References

1930 births
Living people
Administrators of the General Services Administration
Permanent Representatives of the United States to the United Nations
New Hampshire Republicans
Reagan administration personnel